"Sun Daze" is a song recorded by American country music duo Florida Georgia Line. It is the second single from their second studio album, Anything Goes, which was released on October 14, 2014. The song was written by the duo's members Tyler Hubbard and Brian Kelley, along with Sarah Buxton, Cary Barlowe and Jesse Frasure.

History and content
Thematically, the song is about a man who plans to participate in various recreational activities, including flip cup, sexual intercourse, and substance intoxication of cannabis. Country Weekly describes the song as "reggae-indebted" and said that "While it retains the party friendly vibe of much of FGL’s work, the loose, stripped-down production is a bit of a departure for the duo". The group members told the magazine that “It still kinda bumps and it’s still got a cool guitar line and it’s got the whistles going and it’s still groovy. You can’t not shake your head to that song. It’s just a simple song, man. We just try to be very transparent in the way we write and the way we live. There’s nothing better than just kicking back . . . whatever ‘Sun Daze’ is for that person—staying home, making a drink, playing basketball, whatever it may be.”

In an article for The Washington Post, Emily Yahr cited the presence of the term "getting laid" and the double entendre lyric "I'll sit you up on a kitchen sink / Stick a pink umbrella in your drink" as examples of increasingly prominent sexual content in country music in the 2010s.

Critical reception
The song received mixed to negative reviews from several critics. Hannah Smith for Vinyl Mag says "this song [is] incredibly catchy in the worst way. There’s nothing wrong with party songs, but there comes a time when an artist needs to evaluate the direction their career is heading. No one wants to hear middle-aged people singing about getting laid and stoned, which this song addresses multiple times." Jen Swirsky of Country Music Chat gave the song a more positive review, writing "Love it or hate it, 'Sun Daze' is witty. Perhaps witty on subjects that may still be a little too liberal for country music, but witty nonetheless." Country Weekly reviewer Tammy Ragusa was more moderate, praising the reggae influences of the instrumentation while criticizing the lyrical content. She said that "their continued attempts to establish themselves as bad boys, gratuitously dropping in overt references to getting 'laid' and 'stoned', are beginning to sound more cartoonish." She also wrote that "This is the kind of thing that sells and garners airplay, and 'Sun Daze' will do well for FGL", ultimately grading the song "C+".

Commercial performance
The single has been a commercial success for the duo, peaking at #3 on the Billboard Hot Country Songs chart and #1 on the Country Airplay  chart.  The song was  certified Gold by the RIAA on January 29, 2015, and Platinum on September 15, 2015. As of April 2015, the single has sold 618,000 copies in the United States.

Music video
The music video was directed by Marc Klasfeld and premiered in October 2014. Footage from the 2014 installment of WWE Night of Champions is shown in the video, an event which Florida Georgia Line served as guest commentators for as a means of cross-promotion.

Charts and certifications

Weekly charts

Year-end charts

Certifications

References

2014 singles
Florida Georgia Line songs
Song recordings produced by Joey Moi
Republic Nashville singles
Republic Records singles
2014 songs
Songs written by Tyler Hubbard
Songs written by Brian Kelley (musician)
Songs written by Sarah Buxton
Songs written by Cary Barlowe
Music videos directed by Marc Klasfeld
Songs about cannabis
Songs written by Jesse Frasure